Doruneh (also Romanized as Dorūneh, Darooneh, and Daruneh; also known as Dowrūnā and Durūna) is a village in Doruneh Rural District, Anabad District, Bardaskan County, Razavi Khorasan Province, Iran. At the 2006 census, its population was 1,569, in 393 families.

References 

Populated places in Bardaskan County